Mystery Date is a 1991 American teen comedy film.

Mystery Date may also refer to:

Mystery Date (game), a board game from the Milton Bradley Company
"Mystery Date" (Mad Men), an episode of the American AMC series Mad Men
"Mistery Date" , an episode of the American sitcom Modern Family
"Misery Date", an episode of Aaahh!!! Real Monsters